Jones Bar-B-Q may refer to 

 Jones Bar-B-Q Diner in Marianna, Arkansas
 Jones Bar-B-Q (Kansas City)